Carlos Motta may refer to:

 Carlos Motta (artist) (born 1978), Colombian-American artist
 Carlos Motta (boxer) (born 1956), Guatemalan boxer
 Carlos Motta (judoka) (born 1955), Brazilian judoka